Vital du Four (Bazas, 1260-Avignon, 1327) was a French Franciscan theologian and scholastic philosopher, and prior of Eauze.

He became Cardinal in 1312 and bishop of Albano in 1321.

Works 
 Quaestiones disputate de rerum principio, wrongly attributed to Duns Scotus in: Quaestiones disputatae De rerum principio, tractatus De primo rerum omnium principio, novis curis edidit Marianus Fernandez Garcia, Quaracchi, 1910, pp. 1–624.

Studies
 John F. Lynch, The Theory of Knowledge of Vital du Four, St. Bonaventure, Franciscan Institute Publications, 1972.

Notes

External links
Franaut entry

1260 births
1327 deaths
French Franciscans
Scholastic philosophers
14th-century French cardinals
Cardinal-bishops of Albano
French philosophers
French male writers
14th-century philosophers